Risca United Association Football Club is a football club based in Risca, South Wales. The team plays in the Ardal SE.

History

Established in 1946 Risca United A.F.C. are a Welsh League football club. They are nicknamed the "Cuckoos", in keeping with the town's legend of the Cuckoo. The club's motto is "Progress".

The home ground is Ty-Isaf Park, now managed by the club through a long-term lease from its owners, Caerphilly County Borough Council. It is undergoing development to improve its facilities, to include seating in its 500 (standing) capacity spectator stand. Floodlights, improved dressing rooms and playing surface are part of the planned developments. The club has its Social H.Q. at Risca Rugby Football Club, a short drive away from the ground.

Supported by chairman, Jonathan Smith, Secretary, Stuart Luckwell and the Management Committee, the club has two senior teams competing in The Welsh Football League, an under 19s Youth side also competes in the Welsh Youth Cup and the Youth Division of the Welsh Football League.

Risca United are also affiliated to the Clubs for Young People Wales (previously the Boys & Girls Clubs of Wales). Three of its players gained CYP Welsh Caps at under 18 level in season 2011–12.

The club have been in partnership with Coleg Gwent Crosskeys Football Academy and joined with local junior club, Cwmcarn Athletic to become its nursery club, thereby providing coached football for youngsters from under 10 through to Youth and Senior Levels.

Staff and board members

 Assistant managers : Jonathan Smith
 Secretary : Stuart Luckwell
 Treasurer : Jeff Michael

External links
Official website

Football clubs in Wales
Association football clubs established in 1946
1946 establishments in Wales
Welsh Football League clubs
Cymru South clubs